The following is a list of notable deaths in December 2001.

Entries for each day are listed alphabetically by surname. A typical entry lists information in the following sequence:
 Name, age, country of citizenship at birth, subsequent country of citizenship (if applicable), reason for notability, cause of death (if known), and reference.

December 2001

1
Danilo Donati, 75, Italian costume designer and production designer (two-time winner of the Academy Award for Best Costume Design).
Ellis R. Dungan, 92, American film director.
Lin Haiyin, 83, Taiwanese writer.
Roger Leach, 53, English-Australian actor (The Bill), cancer
Baltasar Rebelo de Sousa, 80, Portuguese politician.
Chris Rees, 70, Welsh politician.
Johnny Stearns, 85, American actor, producer and director.
Thomas D. Tannenbaum, 69, American producer.

2
John W. Collins, 89, American chess master, author and teacher.
Chase Craig, 91, American comic strip and comic book writer and cartoonist.
Bruce Halford, 70, British racing driver.
Valorie Jones, 45, American singer and member of The Jones Girls.
Amir Abdullah Khan Rokhri, 85, Pakistani politician.
Naomi Schor, 58, American literary critic and theorist, brain hemorrhage.
Willie Woodburn, 82, Scottish footballer.

3
Dee Barton, 64, American jazz trombonist, big band drummer and composer.
Sir John Allen Clark, 75, British businessman.
Jack Clarke, 68, Australian rules footballer and coach.
Anthony Gigliotti, 79, American clarinetist and music teacher (Philadelphia Orchestra).
Marike de Klerk, 64, First Lady of South Africa, as wife of President Frederik Willem de Klerk, murdered.
Nebojša M. Krstić, 37, Serbian theologian and sociologist, car accident.
Brignol Lindor, 31, Haitian radio journalist and news editor, murdered.
Grady Martin, 72, American country music guitarist (The Nashville A-Team), heart attack.
Warren J. Winstead, 74, American academic.
Harry Winter, 87, Austrian singer.

4
William Jovanovich, 81, Serbian-American publisher, author and businessman (Harcourt, Brace & World, SeaWorld).
Mercedes Matter, 87/88, American painter, draughtswoman, and writer.
Eddie Popowski, 88, American baseball coach and manager.
John Townsend, 85, American basketball player.
Ed Whalen, 74, Canadian television personality and journalist, heart attack.

5
Anton Benya, 89, Austrian politician and trade unionist.
Sir Peter Blake, 53, New Zealand sailor and environmentalist, shot
Siv Holme, 87, Swedish painter and sculptor.
Muhamed Kreševljaković, 62, Bosnian politician and Mayor of Sarajevo.
Moya Lear, 86, American philanthropist.
Franco Rasetti, 100, Italian-American physicist.
Bill Roberts, 89, British athlete.

6
Robert W. Camac, 61, American Thoroughbred horse racing trainer and breeder, murdered.
Thomas William Gould, 86, English Royal Navy submariner and World War II hero (Victoria Cross).
Clarita Hunsberger, 95, American Olympic diver (women's 10-metre platform diving at the 1928 Summer Olympics).
Charles McClendon, 78, American football player (University of Kentucky) and coach (Louisiana State University).
Reginald Pollack, 77, American painter.

7
David Astor, 89, British newspaper proprietor.
James Crutchfield, 89, American blues singer, piano player and songwriter, heart disease.
Peter Elias, 78, American information theorist, Creutzfeldt–Jakob disease.
Faith Hubley, 77, American animator (Moonbird, The Hole, Sesame Street, A Doonesbury Special), breast cancer.
Princess Maria Francesca of Savoy, 86, Italian noblewoman and daughter of Victor Emmanuel III of Italy.
Billie Matthews, 71, American gridiron football coach.
Subrata Mitra, 70, Indian cinematographer.
Pauline Moore, 87, American actress (Heidi, The Three Musketeers, Young Mr. Lincoln, Charlie Chan at Treasure Island).
Sir Raymond Powell, 73, British politician

8
Agha Shahid Ali, 52, Kashmiri-American poet, brain cancer.
Mirza Delibašić, 47, Bosnian and Yugoslav basketball player and coach.
Betty Holberton, 84, American computer programmer, one of six original programmers of the ENIAC computer.
Jock Mulraney, 85, Scottish football player.
Sergei Suponev, 38, Soviet/Russian television director and children's television presenter, snowmobile accident.
Don Tennant, 79, American advertising executive, inventor of Tony the Tiger and the Marlboro Man.
George Young, 71, American football executive.

9
Cesina Bermudes, 93, Portuguese obstetrician ant feminist.
Michael Carver, Baron Carver, 86, British Field Marshal.
Marina Koshetz, 89, American opera soprano and actress.
Jack Rumbold, 81, New Zealand cricketer, Royal Navy officer and colonial administrator.
Sir Frederick Stewart, 85, British geologist.
George Young, 71, American football player, coach and executive.

10
Mikhail Budyko, 81, Russian climatologist.
Wilma Z. Davis, 89, American codebreaker during World War II.
Gus Doerner, 79, American basketball player.
Ashok Kumar, 90, Indian film actor.

11
Beverly Hope Atkinson, 66, American actress, cancer.
Bert Axell, 86, British naturalist and conservationist.
Graham Billing, 65, New Zealand novelist, journalist and poet.
Mainza Chona, 71, Zambian politician and diplomat.
Zdeněk Dítě, 81, Czechoslovak film actor.
Clayton Hare, 92, Canadian violinist, teacher, conductor.
Ramchandra Narayan Dandekar, 92, Indian Indologist and scholar.
Teguh Karya, 64, Indonesian film director, complications from a stroke.
Clark Mills, 86, American boatbuilder and designer.
Sewall Pettingill, 94, American naturalist, author and filmmaker.
Robert B. Pinter, 64, biomedical engineer.

12
Friedel Apelt, 99, German political activist and trades union official.
Josef Bican, 88, Austrian-Czech footballer.
Ardito Desio, 104, Italian explorer, mountain climber, geologist, and cartographer.
Berit Granquist, 92, Swedish Olympic fencer (women's foil at the 1936 Summer Olympics).
Armando Theodoro Hunziker, 82, Argentine botanist (Botanical Museum of the National University of Córdoba).
Farnham Johnson, 77, American professional football player (Chicago Rockets).
Alexander Khmelik, 77, Russian screenwriter, director, writer, creator of Yeralash.
Manuel V. Mendoza, 79, United States Army master sergeant and recipient of the Medal of Honor.
Lê Phổ, 94, Vietnamese painter.
Jean Richard, 80, French actor, comedian, and circus entrepreneur.
U. S. Grant Sharp Jr., 95, United States Navy admiral.
Raymond Smith, 67, English cricketer (Leicestershire).
William Stobie, 51, Northern Irish paramilitary, shot.
Kichirō Tazawa, 83, Japanese politician, esophagus cancer.
Michael Torrens-Spence, 87, British Royal Navy pilot during World War II.

13
Michael Bradshaw, 68, English actor.
Larry Costello, 70, American basketball player and coach, cancer.
Yvan Craipeau, 90, French Trotskyist.
Jack Hoffman, 71, American professional football player (Xavier University, Chicago Bears).
Nigel Lovell, 85, Australian actor and opera director.
Beatrice Macola, 36, Italian actress, cerebral infarction.
Vidadi Narimanbekov, 75, Azerbaijani painter.
Chuck Schuldiner, 34, American death metal guitarist, vocalist and songwriter, brain cancer.

14
Conte Candoli, 74, American jazz trumpeter, prostate cancer.
William A. Crawford, 86, American diplomatand ambassador.
Alfred Byrd Graf, 100, German-American botanist, photographer and author.
John Guedel, 88, American radio and television producer (You Bet Your Life, People Are Funny, The Adventures of Ozzie and Harriet).
Pauline Mills McGibbon, 91, Canadian politician, Lieutenant Governor of Ontario.
Edith Pfau, 86, American painter, sculptor and art educator.
W. G. Sebald, 57, German writer.
André Tollet, 88, French trade unionist and communist.

15
Leopold Borkowski, 82, Polish actor.
Russ Haas, 27, American professional wrestler, heart failure.
Bianca Halstead, 36, American hard rock singer.
José O'Callaghan Martínez, 79, Spanish Jesuit priest and Biblical scholar.
Mel Olson, 70, American choral conductor.
Rufus Thomas, 84, American R&B/soul singer.

16
Stuart Adamson, 43, Scottish singer-songwriter and guitarist of Big Country and The Raphaels.
Roy Brocksmith, 56, American actor.
H. A. Gade, 84, Indian artist.
Stefan Heym, 88, German writer, heart failure.
Martha Mödl, 89, German soprano, and later mezzo-soprano.
Carwood Lipton, 81, American World War II soldier portrayed by Donnie Wahlberg in Band of Brothers.
Lester Persky, 76, American film, television, and theatre producer, complications following heart surgery.
Shyam Sadhu, 60, Indian poet.
Villy Sørensen, 72, Danish writer, philosopher and literary critic.
Sir Michael Walker, 85, British diplomat.

17
Mohammad al-Shirazi, 73, Iranian-Iraqi Shia marja' and political theorist.
Gerald Ashby, 52, English football referee.
Kenneth Bryden, 85, Canadian politician.
Sir Fred Chaney, 87, Australian politician.
Martin Glaberman, 83, American Marxist writer , historian, and academic.
Jeanne Mandello, 94, German artist and experimental photographer.
Alf Wood, 86, English football goalkeeper and manager.

18
Gilbert Bécaud, 74, French singer, composer ("What Now My Love"), pianist and actor.
Dan DeCarlo, 82, American cartoonist (Archie Comics, Sabrina the Teenage Witch, Josie and the Pussycats).
Dimitris Dragatakis, 87, Greek classical music composer.
Mary Hardwick, 88, English tennis player.
Bill Howerton, 80, American baseball player.
Kira Ivanova, 38, Soviet Olympic figure skater (bronze medal winner in women's figure skating at the 1984 Winter Olympics).
Jim Letherer, 67, American civil rights activist.
Marcel Mule, 100, French saxophonist.
Tolomush Okeyev, 66, Kyrgyz screenwriter and film director.
Sietske Pasveer, 86, Dutch speed skater.
Marcelle Tassencourt, 87, French actress and theatre director.
Michael Scaife, 53, British development psychologist.
Cecil Waidyaratne, 63, Sri Lankan general.
Clifford T. Ward, 57, English singer-songwriter, pneumonia.

19
Alfredo Vázquez Carrizosa, 92, Colombian lawyer, politician and diplomat.
Christine Kittrell, 72, American R&B singer, emphysema.
A. C. de la Mare, 69, English paleographer.
Wang Ruowang, 83, Chinese author and dissident.
Hans Warren, 80, Dutch writer, liver problems.
Dale Waters, 92, American football player.
Arkie Whiteley, 37, Australian actress (A Town Like Alice, Mad Max 2, Princess Caraboo), adrenal cancer.

20
Manuhuia Bennett, 85, New Zealand Anglican prelate.
Foster Brooks, 89, American actor and comedian.
Edward Evans, 87, English film and television actor (The Grove Family, Coronation Street, Z-Cars).
Sir Peter Horsley, 80, British air marshal.
Kōji Nanbara, 74, Japanese actor, heart attack.
Kauko Paananen, 77, Finnish equestrian.
Léopold Senghor, 95, first President of Senegal; also a world-renowned poet and writer.
Dame Miraka Szászy, 80. New Zealand Maori leader.
Joan Wheeler, 88, American actress.

21
Eugenia Butler, American art dealer and collector.
Ovidiu Iacov, 20, Romanian footballer, car accident.
Heinz Macher, 81, German Waffen-SS member and Nazi official during World War II.
Kevin Manser, 72, Australian actor.
Ed Salem, 73, American gridiron football player, complications from diabetes.
Dick Schaap, 67, American sportswriter, broadcaster, and author.
Thomas Sebeok, 81, Hungarian-American polymath, semiotician, and linguist.
George Smith, 82, British footballer.
Vladimir Zherikhin, 56, Soviet/Russian paleoentomologist and coleopterist.

22
Grzegorz Ciechowski, 44, Polish rock musician, film music composer, frontman of the band Republika.
Bob Davis, 68, American baseball player.
Randall de Jager, 30, South African actor, killed during robbery.
Shidzue Katō, 104, Japanese feminist and politician.
Jan Kott, 87, Polish theatre critic and political activist.
Norm Larson, 81, Canadian ice hockey player.
Lance Loud, 50, American television personality and magazine columnist, liver failure as a result of hepatitis C.
Genia Nikolajewa, 97, Russian-German actress.
Edwin F. Russell, 87, American newspaper publisher.
Romen Sova, 63, Soviet/Ukrainian toxicologist.
Mary Wynn, 99, American film actress.
Liu Zihou, 92, Chinese politician, governor of Hubei and Hebei.

23
Mark Clinton, 86, Irish Fine Gael politician.
Vicente Gómez, 90, Spanish guitarist and composer.
Bola Ige, 71, Nigerian lawyer and politician (Minister of Justice and Attorney General of Nigeria).
Sir Dimitri Obolensky, 83, Russian-born British historian.
Pedro Richards, 45, English footballer, pneumonia.
Donald C. Spencer, 89, American mathematician,.
Korkut Yaltkaya, 63, Turkish neuropsychiatrist, electrophysiologist and academician.
Jelle Zijlstra, 83, Dutch politician and economist, prime minister (1966-1967),  dementia.

24
Doug Adam, 78, Canadian ice hockey player and coach.
Annie Altschul, 81, Austrian-born British nursing academic.
Robert Leckie, 81, United States Marine and author, Alzheimer's disease.
Frances Macgregor, 95, American photographer, author, sociologist and anthropologist.
Harvey Martin, 51, American gridiron football player, pancreatic cancer.
Hank Soar, 87, American gridiron football player.
Gareth Williams, 48, British musician (This Heat), cancer.

25
Atul Chandra Barua, 85, Indian writer.
Margaret Boden, 89, Scottish artist.
Mike Davis, 45, American professional wrestler, heart attack.
Bryan Drake, 76, New Zealand operatic baritone.
Ramón García, 77, Cuban baseball player.
Sueko Matsueda Kimura, 89, American artist.
Sir Dennis Mitchell, 83, British Royal Air Force officer.
Alfred A. Tomatis, 81, French otolaryngologist and inventor.
Billy Wells, 70, American football player.

26
Jacques Cauvin, French archaeologist.
Nigel Hawthorne, 72, British actor (The Madness of King George, Yes Minister, Tarzan).
Paul Landres, 89, American film and television editor and director.
Tom McBride, 87, American baseball player.
George Rochester, 93, British physicist, heart failure.

27
Jack Beeching, 79, English poet, novelist and nonfiction writer.
Robert Fowler, 70, South African cyclist (silver medal winner of the men's cycling team pursuit at the 1952 Summer Olympics).
Ian Hamilton, 63, British critic, poet, magazine publisher, cancer.
John Hoffman, 58, American baseball player.
Paul Hogarth, 84, British artist.
Haywood Rivers, 79, American contemporary visual artist.
Boris Rybakov, 83, Russian historian.
Jean-Marc Théolleyre, 77, French journalist.
Helen Rodríguez Trías, 72, American pediatrician and women's rights activist, cancer.

28
Samuel Abraham Goldblith, 82, American food scientist.
T. R. Govindachari, 86, Indian chemist ans academic.
William X. Kienzle, 73, American priest and later writer.
Gerard van Leijenhorst, 73, Dutch politician and chemist.
Hovie Lister, 75, American gospel singer and manager of The Statesmen Quartet.
Marcel Niedergang, 79, French journalist and non-fiction author.
Arne Rettedal, 75, Norwegian politician.
Anthony Royle, Baron Fanshawe of Richmond, 74, British politician and businessman.
Lawrence Singleton, 74, American convicted murderer, cancer.
Sam Solon, 70, American politician, malignant melanoma.

29
Takashi Asahina, 93, Japanese conductor.
Brian Bansgrove, 60, New Zealand gaffer.
Tom Bourke, 83, Australian rugby player.
Cássia Eller, 39, Brazilian singer and musician, heart attack.
Thomas S. Estes, 88, American diplomat, congestive heart failure.
Florian Fricke, 57, German musician, stroke.
Eldon Arthur Johnson, 82, Canadian politician.
György Kepes, 95, Hungarian-American painter, photographer, designer, and art theorist.
Anatoly Kubatsky, 93, Soviet/Russian actor.
Clinton D. McKinnon, 95, American politician and journalist.
Louis Waltniel, 76, Belgian politician and industrialist.

30
Raymond D. Bowman, 84, American music critic, concert promoter and writer.
Vladislav Čáp, 75, Czech figure skater.
Eric Cheney, 77, British motorcycle designer.
Frankie Gaye, 60, American soul musician and brother of Marvin Gaye, complications following a heart attack.
Tony Jonsson, 80, Icelandic flying ace during World War II.
Samuel Mockbee, 57, American architect, leukemia.
Ray Patterson, 90, American animator, producer, and director.
James Melvin Scott, 90, American inventor and Senior Olympian.
Dame Sheila Sherlock, 83, British physician.
Ralph Sutton, 79, American jazz pianist, stroke.

31
Mathew Ahmann, 70, American Catholic layman and civil rights activist, cancer.
Matthias Fuchs, 62, German actor.
John Grigg, 77, British writer, historian and politician.
Eileen Heckart, 82, American actress (Butterflies Are Free, The Bad Seed, The First Wives Club), Oscar winner (1973).
Paul Hubschmid, 84, Swiss actor (Funeral in Berlin, My Fair Lady, The Beast from 20,000 Fathoms).
Edward Lee, 87, British scientist and civil servant.
Harshad Mehta, 47, Indian stockbroker and fraudster.
Bernie Purcell, 73, Australian rugby player and coach.
T. M. Chidambara Ragunathan, 78, Tamil, writer, journalist and literary critic.
David Swift, 82, American screenwriter, animator, director, and producer, heart failure.
Guido di Tella, 70, Argentine businessman, academic and diplomat.

References 

2001-12
 12